1986 Emmy Awards may refer to:

 38th Primetime Emmy Awards, the 1986 Emmy Awards ceremony honoring primetime programming
 13th Daytime Emmy Awards, the 1986 Emmy Awards ceremony honoring daytime programming
 14th International Emmy Awards, the 1986 Emmy Awards ceremony honoring international programming

Emmy Award ceremonies by year